The qualification for the 2014 European Baseball Championship was held from July 22 to 27, 2013 in Vienna, Austria and Zurich, Switzerland. 12 teams, qualified based on their recent results and a CEB ranking spanning the last ten years, will have the chance to play this B-Level Qualifier to qualify for 2 spots available among the 10 already qualified teams from the 2012 competition. These are, Belgium, Croatia, Czech Republic, France, Germany, Greece, Italy, the Netherlands, Spain and Sweden.

Pool Vienna

Standings

Final

Pool Zurich

Standings

Final

References

Qualifier European Baseball Championship
European Baseball Championship – Qualification
International sports competitions hosted by Austria
International sports competitions hosted by Switzerland
2013 in Swiss sport
2013 in Austrian sport
Baseball in Austria
Baseball in Switzerland